The following television stations operate on virtual channel 7 in the United States:

 K04RX-D in Preston, Idaho
 K05CF-D in Weaverville, California
 K05DQ-D in Burney, etc., California
 K05EM-D in Paradise, California
 K05FW-D in Girdwood, Alaska
 K05GL-D in Coolin, Idaho
 K07GQ-D in Cedar City, Utah
 K07JO-D in Chelan Butte, Washington
 K07OL-D in Kipnuk, Alaska
 K07PF-D in Homer, Alaska
 K07PG-D in Seward, Alaska
 K07QD-D in Hooper Bay, Alaska
 K07QX-D in Golovin, Alaska
 K07RB-D in Tanana, Alaska
 K07RD-D in Savoonga, Alaska
 K07RJ-D in Holy Cross, Alaska
 K07RK-D in St. Marys, Alaska
 K07RU-D in Dot Lake, Alaska
 K07RY-D in Chignik, Alaska
 K07SS-D in Angoon, Alaska
 K07ST-D in Women's Bay, Alaska
 K07TH-D in Lime Village, Alaska
 K07TK-D in Marshall, Alaska
 K07UY-D in Cortez, Colorado
 K07ZU-D in Blanding, Monticello, Utah
 K07ZY-D in Beaver, etc., Utah
 K07AAN-D in Santa Maria, California
 K08PQ-D in Big Arm/Elmo, Montana
 K08PR-D in Missoula, Montana
 K08PW-D in Laketown, etc., Utah
 K09AI-D in Las Vegas, New Mexico
 K09YP-D in Mink Creek, Idaho
 K09ZK-D in Long Valley Junction, Utah
 K09ZV-D in Helper, Utah
 K10CG-D in Aztec, New Mexico
 K10LH-D in West Glacier, etc., Montana
 K10OA-D in Terrace Lakes, Idaho
 K10PW-D in Gallup, New Mexico
 K10QY-D in Silver City, New Mexico
 K10RI-D in Marysvale, Utah
 K10RJ-D in Woodland & Kamas, Utah
 K10RL-D in East Price, Utah
 K10RO-D in Roosevelt, etc., Utah
 K11BM-D in Methow, Washington
 K11EV-D in Grants, etc., New Mexico
 K11KE-D in Woods Bay, Montana
 K11VI-D in Elkton, Oregon
 K11XD-D in Rural Juab, etc., Utah
 K12CV-D in Riverside, Washington
 K12JJ-D in Benbow, etc., California
 K12LA-D in Kenai, etc., Alaska
 K12NH-D in Hobbs, New Mexico
 K12OC-D in Red River, New Mexico
 K13BA-D in Winthrop-Twisp, Washington
 K13IY-D in Leavenworth, Washington
 K13OW-D in Baker, Montana
 K13PJ-D in Vallecito, Colorado
 K13RK-D in Roswell, New Mexico
 K13WT-D in Plevna, Montana
 K14QC-D in Mexican Hat, Utah
 K14RJ-D in Mayfield, Utah
 K14RP-D in Leamington, Utah
 K14RU-D in Spring Glen, Utah
 K14SE-D in McDermitt, Nevada
 K15CX-D in Oroville, California
 K15FF-D in Salina & Redmond, Utah
 K15GZ-D in Wendover, Utah
 K15IO-D in McCall & New Meadows, Idaho
 K15KK-D in Mt. Powell, New Mexico
 K15KX-D in Circleville, Utah
 K16CH-D in Raton, New Mexico
 K16HW-D in Evanston, etc., Wyoming
 K16IE-D in Coos Bay, Oregon
 K16II-D in Hilldale, Utah
 K16JE-D in Glenns Ferry, Idaho
 K16LU-D in Caballo, New Mexico
 K16LY-D in Childress, Texas
 K16MB-D in Hatch, Utah
 K17DA-D in Lake Havasu City, Arizona
 K17EV-D in Omak, Washington
 K17JW-D in Romeo, Colorado
 K17KF-D in Cambridge, Idaho
 K17KR-D in Winthrop, Washington
 K17MU-D in Rural Sevier County, Utah
 K17MZ-D in Torrey, Utah
 K17NA-D in Panguitch, Utah
 K17NB-D in Henrieville, Utah
 K17ND-D in Koosharem, Utah
 K17NH-D in Sterling, Colorado
 K17NL-D in Enterprise, Utah
 K17NP-D in Columbia, etc., Utah
 K17NY-D in Fruitland, Utah
 K18FR-D in Newport, Oregon
 K18IT-D in Green River, Utah
 K18KI-D in Baker City, Oregon
 K18MH-D in Rural Garfield, Utah
 K18MO-D in Worthington, Minnesota
 K18MX-D in Orangeville, etc., Utah
 K18NC-D in Malad, Idaho
 K18NH-D in Puyallup, Washington
 K18NI-D in Point Pulley, etc., Washington
 K19CM-D in Farmington, New Mexico
 K19EI-D in Pacific C/Cloverdale, Oregon
 K19EU-D in Winnemucca, Nevada
 K19HA-D in Navajo Mtn. Sch., etc., Utah
 K19HB-D in Oljeto, Utah
 K19IG-D in Mexican Hat, etc., Utah
 K19JJ-D in Vale, Oregon
 K19JZ-D in Carlsbad, New Mexico
 K19KE-D in Jolly, Texas
 K19LZ-D in Las Cruces & Organ, New Mexico
 K19ML-D in Wray, Colorado
 K20FS-D in Peetz, Colorado
 K20GH-D in Milford, etc., Utah
 K20GK-D in Pleasant Valley, Colorado
 K20ID-D in Kingman, Arizona
 K20NU-D in Tabiona & Myton, Utah
 K21AM-D in Ninilchick, etc., Alaska
 K21EI-D in Beryl/Modena, etc., Utah
 K21FF-D in Holyoke, Colorado
 K21IL-D in Apple Valley, Utah
 K21IX-D in Montezuma Creek/Aneth, Utah
 K21KA-D in Ferndale, Montana
 K21KC-D in Bluff, etc., Utah
 K21LR-D in Alamogordo, New Mexico
 K21MS-D in La Grande, Oregon
 K21MU-D in Summit County, Utah
 K21OF-D in Tucumcari, New Mexico
 K22FW-D in Mount Pleasant, Utah
 K22IP-D in Virgin, Utah
 K22IX-D in Mayfield, Utah
 K22ME-D in Deming, New Mexico
 K23DE-D in Childress, Texas
 K23GR-D in Preston, Idaho
 K23IS-D in Ridgecrest, etc., California
 K23JD-D in Colfax, New Mexico
 K23JY-D in Huntington, Utah
 K23KP-D in Fishlake Resort, Utah
 K23KY-D in Council, Idaho
 K23MU-D in Bridgeport, Washington
 K23NM-D in Sandpoint, Idaho
 K24DK-D in Bullhead City, Arizona
 K24II-D in Kanab, Utah
 K24IV-D in Farmington, New Mexico
 K24IX-D in Turkey, Texas
 K24JN-D in Lewiston, Idaho
 K24NH-D in Durango, Colorado
 K25PI-D in Kasilof, Alaska
 K25PT-D in Sargents, Colorado
 K26DE-D in Bozeman, Montana
 K26FP-D in Idalia, Colorado
 K26IC-D in Bremerton, Washington
 K26JO-D in Guymon, Oklahoma
 K26LJ-D in Coeur d'Alene, Idaho
 K26NJ-D in Powers, Oregon
 K26OZ-D in Everett, Washington
 K27JT-D in Fillmore, etc., Utah
 K27NH-D in Morgan, etc., Utah
 K28ER-D in Dulce & Lumberton, New Mexico
 K28JR-D in Wanship, Utah
 K28NX-D in Montoya & Newkirk, New Mexico
 K28OF-D in Memphis, Texas
 K28OT-D in Coalville, Utah
 K28OW-D in Parowan/Enoch, etc., Utah
 K29EG-D in Milton, etc., Oregon
 K29IA-D in Centralia, etc., Washington
 K29IT-D in Gateview, Colorado
 K29ML-D in Kanarraville/New Harmony, Utah
 K29NB-D in Cascade, Idaho
 K29NF-D in Anton, Colorado
 K30DT-D in Flagstaff, Arizona
 K30JQ-D in Carbondale, Colorado
 K30KV-D in Crownpoint, New Mexico
 K30MJ-D in Libby, Montana
 K30OF-D in Baker Valley, Oregon
 K30OL-D in Washington, etc., Utah
 K30OX-D in Montpelier, Idaho
 K31DS-D in Coolin, Idaho
 K31EI-D in Cedar Canyon, Utah
 K31HC-D in Quanah, Texas
 K31KB-D in Deming, New Mexico
 K31KJ-D in Big Springs, Texas
 K31LC-D in Nephi, Utah
 K31MK-D in Lawton, Oklahoma
 K31NK-D in Peoa, Oakley, Utah
 K31NU-D in Hanksville, Utah
 K31OB-D in Randolph, Utah
 K31OC-D in Broken Bow, Nebraska
 K31OV-D in Clarendon, Texas
 K31PH-D in Crested Butte, Colorado
 K32HA-D in Bonners Ferry, Idaho
 K32HH-D in Kalispell, Montana
 K32IS-D in Henefer, etc., Utah
 K32MC-D in Baker Flats Area, Washington
 K32MI-D in Delta/Oak City, etc, Utah
 K32MW-D in Logan, Utah
 K32NC-D in Toquerville, Utah
 K32NI-D in Clear Creek, Utah
 K33FT-D in Manti/Ephraim, Utah
 K33FX-D in Heber/Midway, Utah
 K33IY-D in Le Chee, etc., Arizona
 K33JW-D in Rockville/Springdale, Utah
 K33LA-D in Duchesne, Utah
 K33MW-D in Sherburn, Minnesota
 K33PN-D in Ferron, Utah
 K33OL-D in Fremont, Utah
 K33OO-D in Antimony, Utah
 K33OQ-D in Escalante, Utah
 K33PJ-D in Emery, Utah
 K33PK-D in Green River, Utah
 K34AI-D in La Pine, Oregon
 K34CR-D in Alamogordo, etc., New Mexico
 K34IY-D in Boulder, Utah
 K34JD-D in Manila, etc., Utah
 K34MG-D in Garden Valley, Idaho
 K34NN-D in Brewster & Pateros, Washington
 K34NW-D in Rural Garfield County, Utah
 K34OF-D in Caineville, Utah
 K34OJ-D in Park City, Utah
 K34ON-D in Samak, Utah
 K35GD-D in Golconda, Nevada
 K35GG-D in Huntsville, etc., Utah
 K35IJ-D in Hanna & TAbiona, Utah
 K35IQ-D in Vernal, etc., Utah
 K35IR-D in Garrison, etc., Utah
 K35JJ-D in Scofield, Utah
 K35JK-D in Fountain Green, Utah
 K35NK-D in Cannonville, Utah
 K36CC-D in Tulia, Texas
 K36DK-D in Joplin, Montana
 K36JX-D in Many Farms, Arizona
 K36KD-D in Tierra Amarilla, New Mexico
 K36LF-D in Taos, New Mexico
 K36NO-D in Alton, etc., Utah
 K36OY-D in Sterling, Colorado
 K36PS-D in Julesburg, Colorado
 K36PT-D in Haxtun, Colorado
 K39CZ-D in Aberdeen, South Dakota
 K39GH-D in Quanah, Texas
 K39JX-D in Livingston, etc., Montana
 K46KI-D in Woody Creek, Colorado
 K49IT-D in Hagerman, Idaho
 K49KV-D in Stemilt, etc., Washington
 K49KX-D in Orderville, Utah
 KABC-TV in Los Angeles, California
 KAII-TV in Wailuku, Hawaii
 KAIL in Fresno, California
 KAKM in Anchorage, Alaska
 KATV in Little Rock, Arkansas
 KAZT-CD in Phoenix, Arizona
 KAZT-TV in Prescott, Arizona
 KBHO-LD in Richmond, Texas
 KBND-LP in Bend, Oregon
 KBNZ-LD in Bend, Oregon
 KBSH-DT in Hays, Kansas
 KBZK in Bozeman, Montana
 KDNU-LD in Las Vegas, Nevada
 KETV in Omaha, Nebraska
 KGO-TV in San Francisco, California
 KHQA-TV in Hannibal, Missouri
 KHXL-LD in Huntsville, Texas
 KIRO-TV in Seattle, Washington
 KJJC-LD in Helena, Montana
 KJRR in Jamestown, North Dakota
 KKTM-LD in Altus, Oklahoma
 KLTV in Tyler, Texas
 KMGH-TV in Denver, Colorado
 KMNE-TV in Bassett, Nebraska
 KMNF-LD in St. James, Minnesota
 KOAC-TV in Corvallis, Oregon
 KOAM-TV in Pittsburg, Kansas
 KOAT-TV in Albuquerque, New Mexico
 KOSA-TV in Odessa, Texas
 KOTA-TV in Rapid City, South Dakota
 KPLC in Lake Charles, Louisiana
 KPTN-LD in St. Louis, Missouri
 KQCD-TV in Dickinson, North Dakota
 KRCR-TV in Redding, California
 KRMF-LD in Reno, Nevada
 KSPS-TV in Spokane, Washington
 KSWO-TV in Lawton, Oklahoma
 KTBC in Austin, Texas
 KTFT-LD in Twin Falls, Idaho
 KTLE-LD in Odessa, Texas
 KTTW in Sioux Falls, South Dakota
 KTVB in Boise, Idaho
 KUED in Salt Lake City, Utah
 KVIA-TV in El Paso, Texas
 KVII-TV in Amarillo, Texas
 KVYE in El Centro, California
 KWWL in Waterloo, Iowa
 KZCO-LD in Denver, Colorado
 KZFC-LD in Windsor, Colorado
 KZTC-LD in San Diego, California
 W02AT-D in Burnsville, North Carolina
 W04AG-D in Garden City, etc., Virginia
 W07BP-D in Ocala, Florida
 W07DD-D in Champaign, Illinois
 W08AT-D in Cherokee, North Carolina
 W08BF-D in Spruce Pine, North Carolina
 W09AF-D in Sylva, North Carolina
 W09AG-D in Franklin, North Carolina
 W10AD-D in Montreat, North Carolina
 W10AJ-D in Greenville, South Carolina
 W11AN-D in Bryson City, North Carolina
 W15EL-D in Mars Hill, North Carolina
 W18EP-D in Weaverville, North Carolina
 W21DS-D in Sayner/Vilas County, Wisconsin
 W23ES-D in Marshall, North Carolina
 W23EY-D in Canton, North Carolina
 W25ED-D in Albany, Georgia
 W25EM-D in Columbus, Georgia
 W25FW-D in Columbus, Georgia
 W32FI-D in Brevard, North Carolina
 W35DT-D in Beaver Dam, North Carolina
 WABC-TV in New York, New York
 WBBJ-TV in Jackson, Tennessee
 WCIQ in Mount Cheaha, Alabama
 WDAM-TV in Laurel, Mississippi
 WDBJ in Roanoke, Virginia
 WEFG-LD in Philadelphia, Pennsylvania
 WGBS-LD in Carrollton, Virginia
 WHDH in Boston, Massachusetts
 WHIO-TV in Dayton, Ohio
 WITN-TV in Washington, North Carolina
 WITV in Charleston, South Carolina
 WJCT in Jacksonville, Florida
 WJHG-TV in Panama City, Florida
 WJLA-TV in Washington, D.C.
 WKBW-TV in Buffalo, New York
 WKNX-TV in Knoxville, Tennessee
 WLS-TV in Chicago, Illinois
 WPBN-TV in Traverse City, Michigan
 WSAW-TV in Wausau, Wisconsin
 WSPA-TV in Spartanburg, South Carolina
 WSTE-DT in Ponce, Puerto Rico
 WSVN in Miami, Florida
 WTME-LD in Bruce, Mississippi
 WTNG-CD in Lumberton-Pembroke, North Carolina
 WTRF-TV in Wheeling, West Virginia
 WTVW in Evansville, Indiana
 WVII-TV in Bangor, Maine
 WVUA-CD in Tuscaloosa/Northport, Alabama
 WWNY-TV in Carthage, New York
 WXVO-LD in Pascagoula, Mississippi
 WXYZ-TV in Detroit, Michigan

The following stations, which are no longer licensed, formerly operated on virtual channel 7:
 K07QU-D in Shaktoolik, Alaska
 K07QV-D in Hoonah, Alaska
 K07RC-D in Fort Yukon, Alaska
 K07RZ-D in Crooked Creek, Alaska
 K10BB-D in Ardenvoir, Washington
 K11MU-D in Paradise Valley, Nevada
 K14OL-D in Granite Falls, Minnesota
 K29AA-D in Kalispell/Whitefish, Montana
 K30FL-D in Port Angeles, Washington
 K31BZ-D in Wellington, Texas
 K33CQ-D in Canadian, Texas
 K34OG-D in Little America, etc., Wyoming
 K39AN-D in New Mobeetie, Texas
 K41MX-D in Perryton, Texas
 K42CF-D in Gruver, Texas
 K42CR-D in Tucumcari, New Mexico
 K44CG-D in Capulin, etc., New Mexico
 K45AU-D in Follett, Texas
 K48JH-D in Capulin, etc., New Mexico
 K48MH-D in Roswell, New Mexico
 K50NL-D in Lowry, South Dakota
 KCCO-TV in Alexandria, Minnesota
 KFYF in Fairbanks, Alaska
 KJCW in Sheridan, Wyoming
 KQFW-LD in Dallas, Texas
 KSWX-LD in Duncan, Oklahoma
 WNGA-LD in Salisbury, Maryland

References

07 virtual